Paddy O'Reilly is a multiple award-winning Australian writer. Her first major short story prize was the Age Short Story Award in 2002 for her story, "Snapshots of Strangers". She was an Asialink resident to Japan in 1997  and has also won residencies at the Vermont Studio Center, Varuna, The Writers' House, Bundanon Trust, Katharine Susannah Prichard Writers' Centre and the Newcastle Lockup, among others. She has won the Norma K Hemming Award and been shortlisted for the ALS Gold Medal  and the Queensland Premier's Literary Awards. Her novels and stories have been published and broadcast in Australia, Europe and the US. Heart of Pearl, a short film for which she wrote the screenplay, was nominated for an Australian Film Institute award.

Bibliography 
2005 (Novel) The Factory, Thompson Walker, Melbourne, republished 2015 by Affirm Press, Melbourne
2007 (Story Collection) The End of the World, U.Q.P., St Lucia
2007 (Novella) "Deep Water" in Love and Desire, ed. Cate Kennedy, Five Mile Press, Rowville
2012 (Novel) The Fine Colour of Rust, Blue Door HarperCollins, London; Atria Simon and Schuster, New York (writing as P. A. O'Reilly)
2014 (Novel) The Wonders, Affirm Press, Melbourne; Atria Simon and Schuster, New York
2015 (Story Collection) Peripheral Vision, U.Q.P., St Lucia
2022 (Novel) Other Houses, Affirm Press, Melbourne

References

External links 
Austlit page for Paddy O'Reilly
Paddy O'Reilly official site
Review of The End of The World
Review of The Factory
Review of The Fine Colour of Rust
Review of The Wonders
Review of Peripheral Vision
Review of Other Houses

Australian women short story writers
Year of birth missing (living people)
Living people
Australian women novelists
Australian Book Review people